Light-up shoes or LED-shoes are footwear that have built-in light-emitting diodes, usually in the sole part of the shoe. These specialized shoes may be used at parties, festivals, raves and to increase visibility. Originally light-up shoes were marketed towards children, and they had a mechanism where the shoe would light up every time the person would step on the ground with them.

Raves
Ravers use these type of shoes for ostentatious dancing, and especially shuffling is a popular type of dance mechanic.

References

External links
 DIY Light-Up Shoes

Dance
Light art
Light-emitting diodes
Shoes